In molecular biology, ZFAT antisense RNA 1 (non-protein coding), also known as ZFAT-AS1, is a long non-coding RNA. In peripheral blood lymphocytes, it is expressed in CD19+ B-cells. It is an antisense transcript of the ZFAT gene, and negatively regulates the expression of a truncated form of ZFAT, TR-ZFAT, but not of ZFAT. A single nucleotide polymorphism (SNP) which is located in the 3'-UTR of TR-ZFAT and the promoter region of ZFAT-AS1 regulates the expression of ZFAT-AS1, and therefore also affects expression of TR-ZFAT. This SNP is associated with an increased risk of autoimmune thyroid disease.

See also
 Long noncoding RNA

References

Non-coding RNA